Yagoua Airport  is a public use airport located near Yagoua, Extrême-Nord, Cameroon.

See also
List of airports in Cameroon

References

External links 
 Airport record for Yagoua Airport at Landings.com

Airports in Cameroon
Far North Region (Cameroon)